This is a list of achievements in major international judo events according to gold, silver and bronze medal results obtained by athletes representing different nations. The objective is not to create a combined medal table; the focus is on listing the best positions achieved by athletes in major global events, ranking the countries according to the most number of podiums accomplished by athletes of these nations. In order to be considered for the making of the list, the competition must be open to athletes from nations across every continent, with no cultural, geographical, political or other sort of limitation preventing participation of athletes. Invitational-only events were not eligible because they might impose subjective limitations on which athletes are allowed to compete.

For the creation of the list only results from adult competitions were consulted; therefore, results achieved at the Youth Olympic Games and at the World Junior Championships were not considered. Master, Grand Prix and Para meets, such as the Paralympic Games, were not taken into consideration. Results from two major judo world tournaments approved by the International Judo Federation were taken into account: the World Judo Championships and the judo tournament at the Summer Olympic Games.

Results
The conventions used on these tables are namely: EL for Extra Lightweight; HL for Half Lightweight; LW for Lightweight; HM for Half Middleweight; MW for Middleweight; HH for Half Heavyweight; HW for Heavyweight; OP for Open class; and TM for Team event.

Notes
Results achieved in youth or junior events (either at the Youth Olympic Games or the World Junior Championships) were not considered for the making of this table, neither were events for athletes with a disability. 
Medals earned by athletes from defunct NOCs or historical teams have been merged with the results achieved by their immediate successor states, as follows: Russia inherits medals from the Soviet Union and the Unified Team; Serbia inherits medals from Yugoslavia and Serbia and Montenegro; Czech Republic inherits medals from Czechoslovakia; and Germany inherits medals from West Germany and East Germany. It is important to note, however, that the International Olympic Committee does not combine medals of these nations.
 At the 2018 World Championships, judokas from North Korea and South Korea competed as a unified Korean team and won bronze medals in the mixed team competition. These medal were counted for both North Korea and South Korea.
The tables are pre-sorted by total number of medal results. In case of a tie, countries are then compared according to most number of gold medal results, silver medal results and bronze medal results, respectively. Persisting a tie, equal ranks are given, with countries being listed in alphabetical order.

Olympic Games

World Championships

Further reading
 Judo at the Summer Olympics
 World Judo Championships

See also
 Asian Judo Championships
 Judo at the Asian Games
 European Judo Championships
 Judo at the Pan American Games
 List of major achievements in sports by nation

References 
 Sports123: Judo (archived)
 HickokSports.com (archived)

Judo